Benacre may refer to:
Benacre, Suffolk, a village and civil parish in the East Suffolk district of Suffolk, England
Benacre NNR, a National Nature Reserve in Suffolk, England 
Benacre Broad, an isolated broad that is part of Benacre NNR
Benacre Estate and Benacre Hall, the seat of the Gooch Baronetcy of Suffolk, England 
Benacre to Easton Bavents Lagoons, a "Special Area of Conservation" in England
Benacre, Glen Osmond, South Australia,  a house on the Australian Register of the National Estate